Joseph Cunnane D.D. (5 October 1913 – 8 March 2001) was an Irish Catholic clergyman who served as the Archbishop of Tuam from 1969 to 1987.

Born in the parish of Knock in County Mayo, he was educated at St. Jarlath's College, Tuam, and St. Patrick’s College, Maynooth. He was ordained in 1939. Following postgraduate studies in Maynooth he was awarded a Doctorate of Divinity in 1941.

He was professor of Irish at St. Jarlath's from 1941 until 1958 when he was appointed to Balla, County Mayo. He moved to Clifden, County Galway in 1967. He was appointed archbishop of the Metropolitan see of Tuam in 1969 and retired from the post on 11 July 1987.

He died in 2001 and is buried in the grounds of Tuam Cathedral.

References 

1913 births
2001 deaths
People from County Galway
Religious leaders from County Mayo 
Roman Catholic archbishops of Tuam
20th-century Roman Catholic archbishops in Ireland
Alumni of St Patrick's College, Maynooth